Oreste Costa (1851 - 1901) was an Italian painter, active mainly painting genre scenes, landscapes, and still lifes.

Biography
He was born in Florence, and trained under Antonio Ciseri. Among his works was a Gli ultimi Sforzi. His brother Antonio was also a painter. He exhibited frequently in England. One of his paintings, a genre scene with tippling elderly peasants is found at the Hillwood museum.

References

1851 births
1901 deaths
19th-century Italian painters
Italian male painters
20th-century Italian painters
Painters from Florence
Italian costume genre painters
Italian still life painters
19th-century Italian male artists
20th-century Italian male artists